Canaanland is a city where the Home of Signs and Wonders,  Winners' Chapel (Living Faith Church) is based, an Evangelical megachurch in Ota, Ogun State, Nigeria.

The  facility opened in 1999, and has since expanded to almost . It includes the headquarters of Winners' Chapel, the church building itself known as Faith Tabernacle, Covenant University, Faith Academy Secondary School, and Kingdom Heritage Nursery/Primary School. Several business ventures operated by the church are located within the Canaanland complex, including Dominion Publishing House, Hebron Bottled Water Processing Plant, a bakery, various restaurants and stores, four banks, and several residential estates that provide for the over 2,000 church employees and 9,000 students that live there. The 50,000 capacity Faith Tabernacle which was built within 10 months in 1999 is the world's largest church building.

Sunday services see a flood of members arriving at Canaanland, and the church maintains around 350 shuttle buses that bring congregants to the church from local markets and bus stops. The number of services on a Sunday increased from 2 services to 3 services from 17 January 2010. A fourth service began on February 13, 2011. The first service starts at 6:00 am, the second at 7:55 am, the third at 9:50 am and the fourth service at 11:45 am (Nigerian Time). Each service lasts for one hour, fifty-five minutes.

Each second week of December, Canaanland sees almost a million Christian pilgrims from all over the world gather for a program called Shiloh. The Church after Shiloh 2010 (Breakthrough Unlimited) embarked on the building of Canaancity. The first phase will see the completion of 15000 housing units. The founder of Winners' Chapel, Bishop David Oyedepo believes that a divine vision told him to hold such a gathering.

References

External links
David Oyedepo Ministries
Canaanland Jobs

Religious buildings and structures completed in 1999
Evangelical megachurches in Nigeria
1999 establishments in Nigeria
20th-century religious buildings and structures in Nigeria